St. Mark Enthroned is an early painting by the Italian Renaissance artist Titian, created in 1510 or 1511, which is still in the church of Santa Maria della Salute ("Saint Mary of Health") in Venice. 

St. Mark, the patron saint of the Republic of Venice, is portrayed on a high throne, surrounded by St. Roch and St. Sebastian.  Like other Titian paintings from these years, it shows the influence of Giorgione, who died young in 1510.

Sources

Religious paintings by Titian
1510 paintings
1511 paintings
Titian
Titian
Paintings of Saint Roch
Paintings of Saints Cosmas and Damian
Books in art